Lesmahagow railway station served the town of Lesmahagow, South Lanarkshire, Scotland, from 1866 to 1965 on the Blackwood Junction to Alton Heights Junction Line.

History 
The station was opened on 1 July 1905 by the Caledonian Railway. On the west side of the station was the large goods yard. An option was available for a second platform but it was never built. It closed on 4 October 1965.

References

External links 

Disused railway stations in South Lanarkshire
Former Caledonian Railway stations
Beeching closures in Scotland
Railway stations in Great Britain opened in 1905
Railway stations in Great Britain closed in 1965
1905 establishments in Scotland
1965 disestablishments in Scotland